Cerithiovermetus is a genus of sea snails, marine gastropod mollusks in the family Vermetidae, the worm snails or worm shells.

Species
Species within the genus Cerithiovermetus include:

Cerithiovermetus aqabensis Bandel, 2006
Cerithiovermetus vinxi Bandel, 2006

References

External links

Vermetidae